Bolomba Diafutua Ngudiangani (born 14 November 1985 in Levallois-Perret France), commonly known as Gauthier Diafutua, is a French former professional footballer who played as a striker.

Career
Amongst his former teams are Watford, AS Cherbourg, and Belgian sides RAEC Mons, FCV Dender and A.F.C. Tubize.

References

1985 births
Living people
People from Levallois-Perret
French footballers
French sportspeople of Democratic Republic of the Congo descent
Watford F.C. players
AS Cherbourg Football players
R.A.E.C. Mons players
F.C.V. Dender E.H. players
A.F.C. Tubize players
FC Sète 34 players
Aviron Bayonnais FC players
US Quevilly-Rouen Métropole players
Union Royale Namur Fosses-La-Ville players
CMS Oissel players
Belgian Pro League players
Championnat National players
French expatriate footballers
French expatriate sportspeople in Belgium
Expatriate footballers in Belgium
Association football forwards
Footballers from Hauts-de-Seine
Black French sportspeople